Scheifling is a village in Austria in the state of Styria.

History
It was first mentioned 978 AD as 'Sublich'.

Culture
One of many riparian villages along the Mur river, Scheifling is a popular stop for bicyclists traveling along the Mur Bike Trail. It boasts several comfortable inns and restaurants, including the Gasthof Götzl-Rosenkranz (founded in the 19th century). In early July, villagers celebrate the "Scheiflinger Kirta" with live music and dancing.

References

Cities and towns in Murau District